Mani the parakeet (hatched 1997), also called Mani the parrot, is a Malaysian-born rose-ringed parakeet who resides in Singapore. He has been an astrologer "assistant" to M. Muniyappan since 2005, working from his Little India fortune-telling shop along Serangoon Road. M. Muniyappan is locally known to make his predictions using a simplified form of cartomancy.

Mani became a celebrity in Singapore, and later internationally, when he picked the correct winners for all of the 2010 FIFA World Cup quarter-final ties, as well as the Spain-Germany semi-final. However, Mani failed to predict the Spain – Netherlands final by choosing Netherlands as the winner of the 2010 World Cup. At one point on July 5, 2010, a day before the Uruguay-Netherlands semi-final match, Mani topped Google's "Hot Searches" in Singapore.

Prior to his World Cup stint, Mani and his owner M. Muniyappan, used to see an average of 10 customers a day. Following his World Cup success, this increased to around 10 customers an hour.

Predictions 

While Mani typically assisted his owner Muniyappan in fortune-telling in day-to-day work, it was his predictions over the matches of the 2010 FIFA World Cup that saw him gain widespread recognition.

According to Singapore's The New Paper, Mani's most contentious pick for the World Cup thus far was underdog Netherlands to beat Brazil. His prediction later proved to be correct.

The quarter-finals saw Mani guessing the four winners of the matches correctly – Spain, Germany, Uruguay and Netherlands. In the semi-finals, he predicted that Uruguay would beat Netherlands and Spain would defeat Germany, thereby leading to a Uruguay vs. Spain final. Mani went on further to predict that Spain would be champions.

The Uruguay vs. Netherlands prediction turned out to be wrong, with Netherlands progressing on to the final. As a result, Mani made a new prediction for the World Cup Final between Netherlands and Spain. It tipped a Dutch win over Spain. On the other hand, fellow oracle star Paul the Octopus of Germany went for a Spanish victory, resulted in some media outlets describing the game as an octopus-versus-parakeet showdown. However, Spain defeated the Netherlands 1-0.

Results

International reportage 

Following his successful stint in predicting the semi-finalists of the World Cup, Mani rose to international stardom. The New Paper of Singapore was the first to feature his story and predictions, and newspapers from across the globe soon followed suit – partially as a result of The New Paper frequent broadcast on the bird. News agencies including the AFP and Associated Press ran reports on Mani, alongside newspapers such as The Guardian, and American magazine Vanity Fair.

Mani's story is closely aligned with that of Paul the Octopus, who had 100% accuracy in his predictions for the tournament. The two animals chose opposing sides for the final, which caused some media outlets to term it as an octopus vs. parakeet showdown. Mani chose the Netherlands, who lost to Paul's choice of Spain.

See also
 List of individual birds

References

External links 
YouTube: Singapore Psychic Bird Predicts Holland to win World Cup 2010 (video of Mani in action)

Oracular animals
Parakeets
Individual parrots
1997 animal births
2010 FIFA World Cup
Individual animals in Singapore